Sarm (also Romanized as Şarm; also known as Şaram, and Şarmābād) is a village in Kahak Rural District, Kahak District, Qom County, Qom Province, Iran. At the 2006 census, its population was 2,002, in 508 families.

References 

Populated places in Qom Province